Oh-By the Way is an album by the drummer Art Blakey and the Jazz Messengers recorded in 1982 in the Netherlands and released on the Dutch Timeless label.

Reception

Scott Yanow of Allmusic states that "the music is a fine example of high-quality hard bop".

Track listing 
 "Oh-By the Way" (Terence Blanchard) - 6:24   
 "Duck Soup" (Donald Harrison) - 5:55   
 "Tropical Breeze" (Johnny O'Neal) - 4:48   
 "One by One" (Wayne Shorter) - 5:18   
 "Sudan Blue" (Bill Pierce) - 7:03   
 "My Funny Valentine" (Richard Rodgers, Lorenz Hart) - 8:09   
 "Alicia" (Charles Fambrough) - 5:54

Personnel 
Art Blakey - drums
Terence Blanchard - trumpet
Donald Harrison - alto saxophone
Bill Pierce - tenor saxophone
Johnny O'Neal - piano
Charles Fambrough - double bass

References 

Art Blakey albums
The Jazz Messengers albums
1982 albums
Timeless Records albums